The 2000 Purdue Boilermakers football team represented Purdue University in the 2000 NCAA Division I-A football season. They played their home games at Ross–Ade Stadium in West Lafayette, Indiana and competed in the Big Ten Conference. In its fourth year under head coach Joe Tiller, Purdue compiled an 8–4 record, won the conference championship, but was defeated by Washington in the 2001 Rose Bowl.

Purdue's offense was led by quarterback and Heisman Trophy-finalist Drew Brees. Brees led the Big Ten in completions, attempts, passing yards and passing touchdowns, setting the Big Ten career record for career passing yards with 11,517 passing former Purdue player, Mark Herrmann who had set the mark with 9,946 in 1980. The team had neither a 1,000-yard rusher nor a 1,000-yard receiver. Vinny Sutherland was the leading receiver with 926 receiving yards, and Montrell Lowe led the team in rushing with 919 rushing yards. Drew Brees and offensive tackle Matt Light were the only players on the offensive unit selected as an All-American by Pro Football Weekly.

On defense, the 2000 Purdue team had true freshman safety Stuart Schweigert, who intercepted five passes and also led the team in tackles with 85. Other standouts on defense included defensive end Akin Ayodele with 9.0 quarterback sacks, and linebacker Landon Johnson with 71 tackles and two sacks, and safety Ralph Turner with 65 tackles, four sacks and an interception.

Ten members of the team were honored as All-Big Ten Conference selections, quarterback Drew Brees was named the Big Ten Offensive of the Year and the Chicago Tribune Silver Football, while safety Stuart Schweigert was named the Big Ten Freshman of the Year. Nineteen members of the 2000 Boilermakers football team went on to play in the NFL. Prior to 2000, the Boilermakers had compiled three consecutive winning seasons and had not won a Big Ten Championship since the 1967 Purdue team.

The 2000 team, which boasted two future Super Bowl winners, was featured in the 2013 Big Ten Network documentary series Big Ten Elite and is still widely regarded by Purdue fans as one of the greatest Boilermakers football teams of all time. The Boilermakers have yet to win the Big Ten championship or reach the Rose Bowl since then.

Season
The season was Drew Brees's final year with the Boilermakers. He left Purdue with Big Ten Conference records in passing yards (11,792), touchdown passes (90), total offensive yards (12,693), completions (1,026), and attempts (1,678). Brees won the Maxwell Award as the nation's outstanding player of 2000 and won the NCAA's Today's Top VIII Award as a member of the Class of 2001. Brees was third in balloting for the Heisman Trophy in 2000. The Boilermakers won all 8 of their games when they scored 30 points or more in 2000.

Schedule

Roster

Depth chart

Game summaries

Central Michigan

Kent State

at Notre Dame

Minnesota

at Penn State

Michigan

References:

at Northwestern

    
    
    
    
    
    
    
    
    
    

Montrell Lowe 26 Rush, 174 Yds

at Wisconsin

    
    
    
    
    
    
    
    
    

Drew Brees becomes the career passing yardage leader in Big Ten history.

Ohio State

References:

at Michigan State

Indiana

vs. Washington (Rose Bowl)

Rankings

Rivalries
In the battle for the Old Oaken Bucket, Purdue beat Indiana.
In the battle for the Shillelagh Trophy, Notre Dame beat Purdue.

Awards and honors
Drew Brees, Maxwell Award
Drew Brees, Chicago Tribune Silver Football
Tim Stratton, John Mackey Award

Seniors drafted by the NFL

References

Purdue
Purdue Boilermakers football seasons
Big Ten Conference football champion seasons
Purdue Boilermakers football